Firefox Monitor is an online service developed by Mozilla, announced in June 2018 and launched on September 25 of that year.  It informs users if their email address and passwords used have been leaked in data breaches, using the database provided by Have I Been Pwned? (HIBP). Mozilla is also working with HIBP's creator, Troy Hunt.

References

Further reading 
 

Mozilla
Online services
Internet security